State Highway 92 (SH 92) is a state highway that runs  between Stamford and Rotan, Texas. 
 SH 92 was originally designated in 1923-1924 from Bronson to Hemphill. SH 92 was also designated on March 17, 1924, between Stamford and Hamlin. For 3 months, there were two highways numbered SH 92. On June 16, 1924, the SH 92 from Bronson to Hemphill was cancelled, leaving only one SH 92 from Stamford to Hamlin. On February 9, 1933, there was a proposed extension southwest to Longworth. On July 15, 1935, the section from Hamlin to Longworth was cancelled. On August 2, 1937, SH 92 extended from Hamlin to Rotan (this was completed by 1938).

Junction list

References

092
Transportation in Fisher County, Texas
Transportation in Jones County, Texas